Tamás Kiss (born 22 October 1987 in Budapest) is a professional Hungarian footballer currently plays for Rákospalotai EAC.

External links
 HLSZ 
 MLSZ 

1987 births
Living people
Footballers from Budapest
Hungarian footballers
Association football midfielders
Rákospalotai EAC footballers
Budaörsi SC footballers
Vasas SC players